

Current
Al Forno
Angelo's Civita Farnese
Aunt Carrie's
Bess Eaton
Camille’s (Providence, Rhode Island)
The Capital Grille
 Central Diner
Clarke Cooke House
Del's
 Haven Brothers Diner
Modern Diner
Newport Creamery
Olneyville New York System
 Poirier's Diner
White Horse Tavern (Newport, Rhode Island)

Defunct
Bugaboo Creek Steakhouse

References

Rhode Isla